Alexander & Baldwin, Inc. is an American company that was once part of the Big Five companies in territorial Hawaii. The company currently operates businesses in real estate, land operations, and materials and construction. It was also the last "Big Five" company to cultivate sugarcane.

Alexander & Baldwin has its headquarters in downtown Honolulu at the Alexander & Baldwin Building, which was built in 1929. The Alexander & Baldwin Sugar Museum exhibits some of sugarcane company's history.

History

Before Annexation 

In 1831, Dwight Baldwin (1798–1886) and Charlotte Fowler Baldwin were sent by the American Board of Commissioners for Foreign Missions (ABCFM) as medical missionaries to the Sandwich Islands, as the Hawaiian Islands were called at the time. Reverend William Alexander and Mary McKinney Alexander arrived the following year.

Alexander & Baldwin was founded by their sons Samuel Thomas Alexander and Henry Perrine Baldwin (1842–1911) as Samuel T Alexander & Co., in 1870. The two purchased  of land on the island of Maui between Pāia and Makawao, on which they began to cultivate sugarcane.

The land the partners cultivated was semi-arid former dry forest, not ideal for growing sugarcane, a crop that required much water. Samuel Alexander realized that rain was plentiful miles away in the rainforests on the windward slopes of Haleakalā mountain. Work started on the aqueduct in 1876 and was completed two years later in 1878.

After completion of the aqueduct, the company was eventually renamed Alexander & Baldwin Plantation. Between 1872 and 1900, the company took over more land and sugar mill operations. In 1898, Alexander and Baldwin purchased a controlling interest in one of its rival companies, Hawaiian Commercial & Sugar Company (HC&S) from Claus Spreckels. By 1899, the company had bought out Maui's two main railroad lines (Kahului Railroad Company and Maui Railroad & Steamship Company). In 1900, the company incorporated and was renamed Alexander & Baldwin, Ltd.

The Big Five Era

Following incorporation, the company continued to prosper. It came to be one of Hawaii's Big Five companies which held a virtual oligarchy over Hawaii's economy during the region's territorial years.

In 1905, Alexander & Baldwin and other Big Five companies took control of the California and Hawaiian Sugar Company (C&H), giving Alexander & Baldwin a factory where they could refine its sugar.  Over the following decades, the company opened or bought out sugar operations at Puunene, Kahuku, and Kauai island as well as pineapple operations on Maui and Kauai.

In 1908, the company bought a portion of the Matson Navigation Company, a major shipping line operating in the territory. The company sold its sugar interests on Kauai and consolidated all of its Maui operations into an enlarged Hawaii Commercial & Sugar Company in the 1930s while continuing its pineapple operations as well as its sugarcane plantation in Kahuku until the 1960s.

Following World War II, the company entered a new business: land development and real estate. The company formed a new subsidiary, the Kahului Development Co., to develop housing in the Kahului area. In the following years, the company became more involved in the development of its land and the Kahului Development Co. became A&B Properties, Inc.

In 1962, the company purchased all outstanding interests in the Hawaii Commercial & Sugar Company and the sugar operation became wholly owned by Alexander & Baldwin. In 1964, the company also bought out the interests in Matson Navigation Company held by three of its fellow "Big Five" competitors: American Factors, C. Brewer & Co., and Castle & Cooke. In 1969, the company purchased all remaining, outstanding shares in Matson and the shipping company became a wholly owned subsidiary of Alexander & Baldwin.

Diversification

In recent decades, the company's development and real estate division has grown as A&B Properties developed new residential and commercial projects on other land the company owned. In addition, Alexander & Baldwin entered diversified agriculture, beginning to cultivate coffee and macadamia nuts in the 1980s.

End of Sugar Production
On January 6, 2016 Alexander & Baldwin announced plans to transition out of sugar farming on Maui, discontinuing the Maui Sugar brand and ceasing production of sugar at the last remaining plantation on the Hawaiian islands. The company's last sugar mill closed in December of that year.

Matson spinoff
In 2012 the Matson Navigation Company, in which the Alexander & Baldwin had held an investment for 140 years and gained full ownership of in 1969, was spun off as the independent Matson, Inc. company with its headquarters moving from Oakland, California to Honolulu.

Criticism
Before ceasing sugar production in 2016, Alexander & Baldwin had drawn repeated criticism from Maui residents over the use of pre-harvest field burning by its subsidiary Hawaiian Commercial & Sugar Company. HC&S had cultivated up to 35,000 acres of sugarcane on Maui, with roughly 400 acres per week being burned from March to November each year to remove dried leaves from the cane before it is harvested and processed. A spokesman for HC&S claimed that "burning, in the field, is the only economical means HC&S has found to-date of removing the dried leafy material from its crop." Maui environmentalists and physicians countered by asserting that the burning process caused increased rates of asthma and respiratory disease, especially among children, released carcinogens from burning PVC pipes used in the irrigation system, and resulted in highway closures and car crashes. Community organizers called on A&B to replace burning with green harvesting methods, and in 2012, presented the Hawaii Department of Health with a petition signed by 8,700 Maui residents, asking it to deny the company a burning permit for the coming year.

The company's Puunene Mill had also attracted criticism from residents, who pointed out that its equipment did not meet federal emissions standards and that its high coal consumption produced unsafe levels of sulfur dioxide.

Some activists had reported receiving threats from or being assaulted by HC&S employees and members of the International Longshore and Warehouse Union, which had been active in lobbying for continued cane burning on behalf of Alexander & Baldwin.

The company's agricultural practices, as well as its history and the careers of its missionary founders, were satirized by Maui author Tim Parise in the novel Totum Hominem.

List of businesses owned by Alexander & Baldwin, Inc.

A&B Properties, Inc. (real estate and development company)
 Hawaiian Commercial & Sugar Company (sugar growing division) Production was ceased in 2016
 East Maui Irrigation Co., Ltd. (maintains irrigation ditches originally built in the 1870s as noted above)
Maui Brand Sugars (unrefined sugar brand) Production was ceased in 2016
Grace Pacific (Paving and quarrying) acquired by Alexander & Baldwin in 2013
A&B Fleet Services (trucking and fleet-related parts and repair services)
Kahului Trucking & Storage

See also
Economy of Hawaii
 List of S&P 600 companies

Alexander & Baldwin family tree

References

Further reading

External links 
 

Alexander & Baldwin SEC Filings
Alexander & Baldwin - Matson SEC Filings

Agriculture companies of the United States
American landowners
Holding companies of the United States
Sugar companies of the United States
Sugar plantations in Hawaii
Companies based in Hawaii
Companies based in Honolulu
Agriculture companies established in the 19th century
American companies established in 1870
Food and drink companies established in 1870
Manufacturing companies established in 1870
1870 establishments in Hawaii
Companies formerly listed on the Nasdaq
Companies listed on the New York Stock Exchange
Territory of Hawaii
Historic American Buildings Survey in Hawaii